Dr. Marta Mirazón Lahr (born 1965) is a palaeoanthropologist and Director of the Duckworth Laboratory at the University of Cambridge.

Academic career
Born in Buenos Aires, Argentina, Mirazon Lahr graduated in Biology from the University of São Paulo, Brazil. She later earned a Masters and PhD in Biological Anthropology from the University of Cambridge, following which she was elected to a Junior Research Fellowship at Clare College. She was then an Assistant Professor at the Department of Biology of University of São Paulo (1995–98), before returning to Cambridge in 1999 as a lecturer in Biological Anthropology and Fellow of Clare College. Mirazon Lahr was promoted to University Reader in Human Evolutionary Biology in 2005.

In 2001 Mirazon Lahr, with co-founder Robert Foley, established the Leverhulme Centre for Human Evolutionary Studies (LCHES) at the University of Cambridge, with funding from the Wellcome Trust and the Leverhulme Trust. The Centre was designed to provide a home for the Duckworth Collection, and up-to-date laboratories and facilities to support research in human evolution which integrated genetics, anthropology, and other fields.

Mirazon Lahr was awarded the Phillip Leverhulme Prize in 2004.

Research
Lahr's research is in human evolution, and ranges across human and hominin morphology, prehistory and genetics. Her early work provided a test of the Multiregional Hypothesis of modern humans origins, and underlined much of the argument against models of regional continuity in traits between archaic and modern humans. This research expanded into a fuller consideration of the origins of modern human diversity, published as a book in 1996 - The Evolution of Human Diversity - by Cambridge University Press. Her subsequent research continues to explore human diversity from a number of different perspectives and methodological approaches, and includes archaeology, palaeobiology, genomics and human biology.

She and Robert Foley were the first to propose a ‘southern route’ for humans out of Africa, and for human diversity to be the product of multiple dispersals as well as local adaptation. She has led field projects in the Amazon, the Solomon Islands, India, the Central Sahara  and Kenya, the last two focusing on issues to do with the origins and dispersals of modern humans in Africa.

Mirazon Lahr is currently the director of the IN-AFRICA Project, an Advanced Investigator Award from the European Research Council (ERC) to examine the role of east Africa in modern human origins. As part of the IN-AFRICA Project, she has led the excavations at the site of Nataruk in Turkana, Kenya, establishing the existence of prehistoric warfare among nomadic hunter-gatherers 10,000 years ago.

She was recently interviewed alongside Richard and Meave Leakey as part of the documentary 'Bones of Turkana', a National Geographic Special about palaeoanthropology and human evolution in the Turkana Basin, Kenya.

Selected publications
 
 
 
 
 
 
 Mirazón Lahr, M.; Foley, R.; Armitage, S.; Barton, H.; Crivellaro, F.; Drake, N.; Hounslow, M.; Maher, L.; Mattingly, D.; Salem, M.; Stock, J. & White, K. (2008) DMP III: Pleistocene and Holocene palaeoenvironments and prehistoric occupation of Fazzan, Libyan Sahara. Libyan Studies 39: 263-294. 
 
 
 
 
 Mirazon Lahr, M. (2013) Genetic and fossil evidence for modern human origins. In: P. Mitchell & P. Lane (Eds.). Oxford Handbook of African Archaeology, pp 325–340. Oxford: OUP.

References

External links
 Marta Mirazón Lahr's homepage
 Marta Mirazón Lahr on Academia.edu
 Mirazón Lahr speaking at the 3rd Annual Human Evolution Symposium (film)
 The Leverhulme Centre for Human Evolutionary Studies homepage
 The 'In Africa' ERC Project homepage

1965 births
Living people
Alumni of Clare College, Cambridge
Fellows of Clare College, Cambridge
Evolutionary biologists
Human evolution theorists
University of São Paulo alumni